Diamond Island is a 2016 drama film directed and co-written by Davy Chou. The film 
is a co-production between Cambodia, France, Germany, Thailand and Qatar. The film features a cast of debuting actors. Casting took place over five months in the streets of Phnom Penh and on Facebook. The film was screened in the International Critics' Week section at the 2016 Cannes Film Festival where it won the SACD Award.

Cast 
 Sobon Nuon as Bora
 Cheanick Nov as Solei 
 Madeza Chhem as Asa
 Mean Korn as Di
 Samnang Nut as Virak
 Sophyna Meng as Mesa
 Sreyleap Hang as Pinky
 Jany Min as Lida
 Samnang Khim as Leakhena
 Batham Oun as Blue

References

External links 
 

2016 films
Khmer-language films
Cambodian drama films
Cambodian coming-of-age films
French drama films
German drama films
Thai drama films
Qatari drama films
Films directed by Davy Chou
2016 drama films
2010s French films
2010s German films